Ada Chaseliov (March 30, 1952 – October 27, 2015) was a Brazilian film, stage, and television actress.

Life
Chaseliov was born in Rio de Janeiro in 1952. She studied at drama school before her film debut in 1973 in Um virgem na praça. In 1974, she made her first appearance on TV in the telenovela Supermanoela.

The actress participated in several soap operas on Rede Globo, including the Brazilian telenovela Guerra dos Sexos in 1983, where she played the jealous and tormented Manoela, and the telenovela Belíssima. These series were both created by Silvio de Abreu. Her greatest achievement on TV is said to be the villain Leonor in the miniseries A Muralha which was broadcast on the free to air Brazilian network Rede Globo in 2000.

Chaseliov appeared on Brazilian television as a judge in the soap opera Amor à Vida in 2013. It was her last appearance in a telenovela. She died in São Paulo in 2015 from cancer. She had a daughter, Mila Chaseliov, with film director Ney Sant'Anna.

Filmography

References

1952 births
2015 deaths
People from Rio de Janeiro (city)
Brazilian actresses